Muskum (Muzgum, Muzuk) is an extinct Chadic (Biu–Mandara) language of Chad. Speakers have shifted to Musgu [mug].

References

Biu-Mandara languages